Ekeler is a surname. Notable people with the surname include:

Austin Ekeler (born 1995), American football player
Mike Ekeler (born 1971), American football coach

See also
Eckler, surname